A narodny dim is a community hall, used for cultural and social purposes by Ukrainians in Ukraine and in the Ukrainian diaspora. Narodoni dim literally means "people's home" or "national hall". Narodny domy (plural) were modeled after the chytalni or reading halls of Austrian Galicia, many of which were coordinated by the Prosvita society.

Members of the Supreme Ruthenian Council started establishing these halls in the Austrian-ruled Kingdom of Galicia and Lodomeria during the "Spring of Nations" period of European history.

Canada 
Narodni domy in Canada typically were either governed independently or affiliated with various political or religious groups who competed for members and funds.  In Alberta in the early 20th century 45% of the halls were independent, 35% were communist, and the rest were Ukrainian Catholic-controlled.  Independent halls were often linked to either the "Russo-Greek Orthodox" church or the Ukrainian Orthodox Church of Canada. Socialist halls were organized by the Ukrainian Labour-Farmer Temple Association, and became known as "labour temples".

The main function of the hall's governing board (zariad) is to organize plays, concerts, dances, and other cultural activities. They have differed from other community halls in Canada by offering Ukrainian-language music and plays and because of their political and religious associations.

Small narodni domy were once common throughout the Ukrainian bloc settlements but many of those have since closed, and the remaining ones tend to be in larger urban centres. Examples are:

 Ukrainian Cultural Centre of Toronto
 Ukrainian Labour Temple, Winnipeg

Ukraine 
The Prosvita chytalni / reading halls survived the Ukrainian War of Independence from 1918 to 1921 and the Pacification of Ukrainians in Eastern Galicia in 1930. However, the network of these community halls was liquidated by the Soviet regime in 1939 after their annexation of West Ukraine (East Poland).

Gallery

Further reading 
 Makuch, Andrij, "Narodni Domy in East Central Alberta" in Continuity and Change: The Cultural Life of Alberta's First Ukrainians, ed. Manoly R. Lupul (Edmonton: Canadian Institute of Ukrainian Studies and the Alberta Historic Sites Service, 1988), pp 202-210

References

See also 
 Bohemian National Home, Detroit, Michigan
 Chitalishte, the Bulgarian equivalent

Community centres in Canada
Ukrainian-Canadian culture
Ukrainian diaspora
Ukrainian diaspora in Canada